The 2012–13 Northwestern State Demons basketball team represented Northwestern State University during the 2012–13 NCAA Division I men's basketball season. The Demons, led by 14th year head coach Mike McConathy, played their home games at Prather Coliseum and were members of the Southland Conference. They finished the season 23–9, 15–3 in Southland play to finish in second place. They were champions of the Southland Conference tournament, winning the championship game over Stephen F. Austin, to earn an automatic bid to the 2013 NCAA tournament where they lost in the second round to Florida.

Roster

Schedule

|-
!colspan=9 style=| Non-conference regular season

|-
!colspan=12 style=| 2013 Southland Conference tournament

|-
!colspan=12 style=| 2013 NCAA tournament

References

Northwestern State
Northwestern State
Northwestern State Demons basketball seasons
2012 in sports in Louisiana
2013 in sports in Louisiana